The 2010 Republic Cup commenced on 6 March 2010 with the first Round and concluded on 18 July 2010 with the Final, held at the Anjalay Stadium. The final was contested by Pamplemousses SC and Petite Rivière Noire SC. The match was still goalless after extra-time. Pamplemousses SC won the final in the penalty shootout 6–5.

Round 1

Quarterfinals

Semifinals

Final

References

Mauritian Republic Cup
Republic Cup